Leucostethus ramirezi is a species of frog in the family Dendrobatidae that is endemic to Colombia. It is only known from the region of its type locality, Urrao in the Antioquia Department. Its natural habitat is sub-Andean forest.

References

Poison dart frogs
Amphibians of Colombia
Endemic fauna of Colombia
Taxa named by Marco Antonio Serna Díaz
Taxa named by Juan A. Rivero
Taxonomy articles created by Polbot